Pinkneyville is an unincorporated community located within Andover Township in Sussex County, New Jersey, United States.

Pinkneyville was described in 1872 as "a little mining village, with only a few small cottages".

In 1891, the "remotest source" of the Pequest River was described as being "near Pinkneyville".

References

Andover Township, New Jersey
Unincorporated communities in Sussex County, New Jersey
Unincorporated communities in New Jersey